Osiedle Piasta II is one of the districts of the Polish city of Białystok. Named after the royal Piast dynasty.

External links

Districts of Białystok